Armando Romero (born February 10, 1983) is a retired professional soccer player.  He played for the Charleston Battery in the First Division in  2006 and 2007.

Armando attended public schools in Arlington County, Virginia, and played for the Arlington Fireballs and Arlington Mustangs club teams in the National Capital Soccer League (NCSL).  He attended Yorktown High School where he was a soccer standout.  Armando was named National District Player of the Year as a junior in 2001 (Virginia public schools play soccer in the spring.)  He was All-District as a sophomore, junior, and senior and All-Region and All-Met as a junior and senior.

Armando attended Louisburg (junior) College in Louisburg, North Carolina, where during his freshman and sophomore years he starred for the Hurricanes, a NJCAA Top Ten team.  He transferred to Radford University in his junior year and quickly established himself as an offensive leader.  Following his senior season in 2005, he was named to the Big South Conference First Team.

References

1983 births
Living people
Sportspeople from Arlington County, Virginia
Louisburg Hurricanes men's soccer players
Radford Highlanders men's soccer players
Soccer players from Virginia
American soccer players
Association football midfielders
Charleston Battery players
USL First Division players
American sportspeople of Salvadoran descent